The 2005–06 CHL season was the 14th season of the Central Hockey League (CHL).

Regular season

Division standings

Note: GP = Games played; W = Wins; L = Losses; SOL = Shootout loss;  Pts = Points; GF = Goals for; GA = Goals against

y - clinched league title; x - clinched playoff spot; e - eliminated from playoff contention

Playoffs

Playoff bracket

Central Hockey League seasons
2005–06 in American ice hockey by league